Sukha Balka is a rural settlement in Toretsk municipality of Donetsk Oblast of eastern Ukraine, at 40.6 km NNW from the centre of Donetsk city, at 14.5 km SW from Toretsk.

On 22 August 2006 a Pulkovo Aviation Enterprise flight crashed near the settlement. All 170 people on board were killed.

The War in Donbass, that started in mid-April 2014, has brought along both civilian and military casualties. A male civilian was killed by shelling on 14 June 2017.

Demographics
In 2001 the settlement had 649 inhabitants. Native language as of the Ukrainian Census of 2001:
Ukrainian — 6.16%
Russian — 93.84%

References

Rural settlements in Donetsk Oblast